István Gaál (25 August 1933 – 25 September 2007) was a Hungarian film director, editor and screenwriter. He directed more than 20 films between 1956 and 1996. With Falcons he won the Jury Prize at the 1970 Cannes Film Festival.

Selected filmography
 Current (1963)
 The Falcons (1970)
 Cserepek (1980)
 Peer Gynt (1988)

References

External links

1933 births
2007 deaths
Hungarian film directors
Hungarian film editors
Male screenwriters
Hungarian male writers
People from Salgótarján
20th-century Hungarian screenwriters